Y Dinesydd (Welsh for The Citizen) is a monthly local Welsh-language newspaper (normally called a Papur Bro) for Cardiff, Wales, established in October 1973. It is available at schools, chapels, various organisations and companies. It contains news and articles about organisations in Cardiff and includes paid advertisements. These organisations include: Cricc, Côrdydd, Menter Caerdydd, Eglwys Minny Street, Eglwys y Crwys, Eglwys Annibynnol Ebeneser, Ysgol Gyfun Gymraeg Glantaf, Ysgol Gyfun Plasmawr, Ysgol Melin Gruffydd, Aelwyd CF1 and many more. They are based in Llandaff North, an area of Cardiff.

The paper was free until 2013, when they began to charge a fee. An online version was also introduced in 2013, in conjunction with Menter Caerdydd, with a launch event held at the Tafwyl festival in June.

References

External links
Y Dinesydd: official website
BBC Cymru page for Y Dinesydd

Dinesydd
Dinesydd
Dinesydd
Publications established in 1973
1973 establishments in Wales
Monthly newspapers